Christian Fabrice Okoua (born 18 November 1991) is an Ivorian football goalkeeper playing for Portuguese club F.C. Tirsense.

International career 
Okoua represented his country at the 2008 Olympic Games. He was the youngest player at the games. Okoua played by Toulon Tournament 2008 for Ivory Coast Under-23 and was member of the African Nations Championship 2009 in Ivory Coast, he was member of the 2007 Meridian Cup.

Personal life 
Okoua is nicknamed Toldo.

References

External links
Christian Fabrice Okoua at ZeroZero

1991 births
Living people
Ivorian footballers
Ivorian expatriate footballers
Africa Sports d'Abidjan players
F.C. Tirsense players
Footballers at the 2008 Summer Olympics
Olympic footballers of Ivory Coast
Association football goalkeepers
Ivorian expatriate sportspeople in Portugal
Expatriate footballers in Portugal
Ivory Coast A' international footballers
2009 African Nations Championship players